Buchanhaven is a village in Aberdeenshire, Scotland, dating to around 1739. It is one mile north of Peterhead town centre, and near to the mouth of the River Ugie.  It has its own school, Buchanhaven Primary School, which caters for children in Buchanhaven and the nearby Waterside estate.  It is also the home of Buchanhaven Hearts F.C.

Originally "a good distance from Peterhead", the village was extended, by the feuing of two streets, by James Ferguson, the third Laird of Pitfour, in 1796.

Harbour
Buchanhaven houses a small harbour with several boats. The harbour is owned by the Feuars Managers, but it is under the control of the Buchanhaven Harbour Committee.  The committee consists of six members all of whom must be boat owners.  Each member sits on the committee for three years before he has to be re-elected; two members are re-elected each year at the annual general meeting.

The pier was built in the 19th century; it replaced a smaller, earlier pier built a few hundreds yards to the north.  A diesel cable winch is situated at the top of the pier for the purpose of hauling boats from the slipway to the shore and vice versa.  The harbour has a total capacity of 18 boats, although only about half of those berths are used each year.

References

External links

 British History Online
 Buchanhaven Community Action Plan 2012 - contains historical information

Villages in Aberdeenshire
Geography of Peterhead